Eremina desertorum (formerly Helix desertorum) is a species of land snails in the genus Eremina.

A specimen from Egypt, in the British Museum, and thought to be dead, was glued to an index card in March 1846. However, in March 1850, it was nevertheless found to be alive. The Canadian writer Grant Allen observed:

It is reported that the museum specimen was then transferred to a large glass jar where it lived for a further two years subsisting largely on cabbage leaves. During this period it successfully re-entered and left torpor once more.

It was later shown that the species could survive in suspended animation without food or water for even longer. As part of an experiment, 40 snails were put into a tin box in 1904. Approximately 8 years later, in 1912, 10 of them were found to be still alive.

References 

Helicidae
Molluscs described in 1775
Taxa named by Peter Forsskål